Sean Gravina (born 21 October 1986) is a Maltese chef and a former water polo player with Neptunes WPSC. He is probably best known for appearing in the quarter final of Series 7 of Master Chef on BBC2 in 2014. He is currently Chef Patron at Crust.

Career 
An ITS graduate, Sean started his career cooking at The Hilton Malta and Chez Phillipe. This was followed by a stint at London's Le Cordon Bleu, where he received a diploma in French cuisine. While in London, Sean worked for Gordon Ramsay at Maze in Mayfair, as well as London's The Dorchester under the guidance of Chef Wolfgang Puck.

Personal life 
In May 2016, it was announced that Sean and his partner, Ira Losco, were expecting a baby. Their son, Harry, was born on 25 August 2016. On 1 December 2019, Sean and Ira got married. 
On 14 November 2020, Sean became a father for the second time, when his wife Ira gave birth to their daughter, Gigi.

References 

Living people
1986 births
Maltese male water polo players
Maltese chefs